Pediasia truncatellus is a species of moth in the family Crambidae described by Johan Wilhelm Zetterstedt in 1839. It is found in Fennoscandia, northern Russia, the Baltic region, the Czech Republic and Canada.

The wingspan is 25–30 mm. The forewings are dark reddish brown, with a darker basal half. The hindwings are dark smoky. Adults are on wing in June and July in northern Europe and in June North America.

The larvae possibly feed on Sphagnum species.

References

Moths described in 1839
Crambini
Moths of Europe
Moths of North America